TA3 is a Slovak private news channel. It started officially broadcasting on 23 September 2001, although its first (special) broadcast was on 11 September 2001 due to the September 11, 2001 attacks. The headquarters are located in Bratislava, in the Ružinov borough.

TV presenters 
 Katrin Lengyelová
 Lucia Nicholsonová

Broadcasting
TA3 broadcasts from 6:00 a.m. until 1:00 a.m. on weekdays, and on weekends from 7:00 a.m. In the nighttime, Ring TV is broadcasting on this channel.

HD
High-definition (HD) broadcasting via satellite was started in December 2016 using Astra 3B-capacities.

External links

TA3 at LyngSat Address
Program TV TA3

References

Mass media in Bratislava
Mass media in Slovakia
Television channels in Slovakia
Television channels and stations established in 2011